Jeongak (literally "proper music") is that category of Korean music which is considered classical, as distinct from minsogak which is folk music. The category has traditionally been associated with the upper classes.

The best known pieces of jeongak are Sujecheon and the suite entitled Yeongsan Hoesang (영산회상; 靈山會相). Another commonly performed jeongak suite is called Cheonnyeonmanse (천년만세; 千年萬歲).

See also
Joseon Dynasty
Korean court music
Korean culture

External links
Jeongak - Official Seoul City Tourism
Traditional Korean Music webpage

Korean styles of music

ko:한국 전통 음악#정악